Pellville is an unincorporated community in Hancock County, Kentucky, in the United States. The ZIP code is: 42364

History
Pellville was incorporated in 1870.  It was originally known as Bucksnort and then later on had a post office named Blackford, Kentucky.  The town was renamed to honor Samuel B. Pell (who was a former state legislator) in 1868.

Notable people
Baseball player Johnny Morrison was born in Pellville.

References

Unincorporated communities in Hancock County, Kentucky
Unincorporated communities in Kentucky